Milton Taylor Armstrong (August 23, 1887 – November 12, 1957) was a dentist and politician in Ontario, Canada. He represented Parry Sound in the Legislative Assembly of Ontario from 1934 to 1943 and from 1945 to 1948 as a Liberal.

The son of Samuel Armstrong and Catherine Taylor, he was born in McKellar and was educated in Parry Sound and at Toronto University.

References

External links

1887 births
1957 deaths
Ontario Liberal Party MPPs